LaVonna Ann Martin-Floreal (born November 18, 1966) is an American former track and field athlete who competed mainly in the 100-meter hurdles. She won an Olympic silver medal in 1992.

Career
She competed for the United States in the 1992 Summer Olympics held in Barcelona, Spain in the 100 meter hurdles and won the silver medal. She had also competed at the 1988 Summer Olympics in Seoul, where she reached the Semi-finals. In 1987 she won the Gold Medal at the Pan American Games.

Personal life
Martin-Floreal is a graduate of the University of Tennessee, Knoxville, and is married to former Canadian Olympic triple jumper Edrick Floreal, head track and field coach at University of Texas. They have a daughter, Mimi, and a son, EJ, who played for the Kentucky Wildcats men's basketball team but switched to Track and Field in 2017.

International competitions

References 

 

1966 births
Living people
Sportspeople from Dayton, Ohio
American female hurdlers
Olympic silver medalists for the United States in track and field
Athletes (track and field) at the 1988 Summer Olympics
Athletes (track and field) at the 1992 Summer Olympics
Pan American Games gold medalists for the United States
Pan American Games medalists in athletics (track and field)
Athletes (track and field) at the 1987 Pan American Games
World Athletics Championships athletes for the United States
Tennessee Volunteers women's track and field athletes
Track and field athletes from Ohio
Medalists at the 1992 Summer Olympics
Goodwill Games medalists in athletics
Competitors at the 1990 Goodwill Games
Medalists at the 1987 Pan American Games
20th-century American women
21st-century American women